Pavel Kastusik (born in Minsk, 1976)
Belarusian artist, whose works range from oil paintings to graphic arts.

References
Biography on Bella Belarus site

External links
Online Gallery
Belarusian artists' exhibition in Poland

1976 births
Living people
Artists from Minsk
Date of birth missing (living people)